The Steilacoom–Anderson Island ferry is a ferry route in southern Puget Sound which is owned and operated by Pierce County, Washington.  The route also serves Ketron Island.

History
The first ferry service to Anderson Island was on April 1, 1922, with the ferry Elk (later renamed Airline), running under a contract between Pierce County, Washington and the Skansie Brothers.  Elk was new at the time, and could transport 16 automobiles.  The Skansie brothers were successful at securing other ferry contracts, and they built most of their ferries, including Elk in their own shipyard.  Traffic increased and by 1924, the Skansies were able to put another ferry on the route, the City of Steilacoom, with a capacity for 30 automobiles.  The City of Steilacoom had a single deck with a small elevated control room, and a ramp, and looked like a powered barge.

In 1934–35, the ferry service was still being conducted by the Skansie brothers, who were doing business as the Washington Navigation Company, under Mitchell Skansie, president.  The ferry continued to depart from Steilacoom, and made stops at Anderson Island, Longbranch, Washington and McNeil Island, with no stop listed for Ketron Island. Four runs per day were made in 1934–35, with additional trips if traffic demanded.

In 1938 Pierce County assumed control of the ferry service over and contracted it out for operation.  In 1939, Pierce County bought the ferry Pioneer, which had been built in 1916, to serve as reserve boat.  Pioneer had been employed on the Deception Pass ferry until 1935, when that route was eliminated by the construction of the Deception Pass Bridge.  Pioneer was sold in 1964.

In 1967 Pierce County bought the wooden-hulled motor ferry Tourist II (95 tons, capacity: 22 automobiles), which had been running on the Astoria–Megler route from 1924 to 1966, and renamed the vessel Islander.  Although over 40 years old, Islander had been well maintained and was in excellent condition.

In 1995 the  M/V Christine Anderson was placed on the route.

Current status
In 2010 the ferry on the route M/V Christine Anderson was renovated at a cost of $1.5 million, 80% of which was paid for by the Federal Transit Administration.  The work took 8 weeks in dry dock.  In addition, $71,000 worth of repairs were done to the Steilacoom, Anderson Island, and Ketron Island ferry docks.  62% of this cost was paid for with Federal stimulus funds.

There are 10 to 14 runs from Steilacom to Anderson Island per day, depending on the day of the week.  Four runs per day detour to Ketron either from (mornings) Steilacoom Dock or back from Anderson Island (evenings).

Notes

References
 Feagans, Raymond J., The Railroad that Ran by the Tide – Ilwaco Railroad & Navigation Company of the State of Washington, Howell-North, Berkeley, CA 1972 
 Findlay, Jean Cammon and Paterson, Robin, Mosquito Fleet of Southern Puget Sound, Arcadia Publishing (2008) 
 Galentine, Elizabeth,  and Anderson Island Historical Society, Anderson Island, Arcadia Publishing (2006) 
 Kline, Mary S., and Bayless, G.A., Ferryboats – A Legend on Puget Sound, Bayless Books, Seattle, WA 1983 
 Town of Steilacoom official website (accessed 05-24-11)
 Pierce County Ferry System official site (accessed 05-24-11).
 Pierce County Rider Information, “M/V Christine Anderson Returns to Service” (May 11, 2010) (accessed 05-25-11)
 Pierce County Public Works and Utilities Airport and Ferry Division, Memorandum, “Ferry Performance Measures” (April 8, 2011) (accessed 05-23-11).
 Town of Steilacoom official website (accessed 05-24-11)

Further reading
 Heckman, Hazel, Island in the Sound, University of Washington Press (1997) 
 Newell, Gordon R. ed., H.W. McCurdy Marine History of the Pacific Northwest,  Superior Publishing, Seattle WA 1966 

Ferry routes in western Washington (state)
Transportation in Pierce County, Washington
History of Pierce County, Washington
1922 establishments in Washington (state)